This is a list of characters and their voice actors from Legend of the Galactic Heroes.

Main characters

Reinhard von Lohengramm
Reinhard von Lohengramm, voiced by Ryō Horikawa (OVA series), is one of the protagonists in the series along with Yang Wen Li.
Nicknamed The Golden Brat by his foes and The Golden Lion by his supporters, he was born into a noble but poor family as Reinhard von Müsel. As a child, he lived with his father and his older sister, Annerose. (He encountered his mother's death when he was still very young and thus his memories of her were very faint.)

It is in a middle-class neighborhood, into which Reinhard's family moves, that Reinhard meets Siegfried Kircheis, with whom he develops an intimate friendship. When his father was compelled to sell Annerose for money as a concubine of Emperor Friedrich IV, young Reinhard swears to put an end to the Goldenbaum Dynasty. His determination to avenge the corrupted society thereupon kindles.

He decides to leave home to join the Cadet School, and persuades Kircheis to come with him. At the age of 15, Reinhard and Kircheis enter their first active service in the army; their rapid promotion in rank follows, owing it to their outstanding contributions to the country. With brilliancy in military strategy especially at a macro-level, and giftedness in civil affairs and in identifying ones with talent, Reinhard succeeds in attracting a great number of able officers, gaining as well the admiration of the public. In solidifying his grounds by gathering advocates, Reinhard does not miss an opportunity to take advantage of his handsomeness and other charming qualities. After being admitted to admiralty at the age of 21, Friedrich IV confers Reinhard the name of Lohengramm, a name of high noble rank which had been defunct until the occasion.

As his next step, he quickly extends his influence over state matters, and shortly after the decease of the Emperor, eventually overthrows the pre-existing dynasty and marks the beginning of the Lohengramm Dynasty. Reinhard's coronation does not precede his own death by much. Believing that the Universe should be reigned over by the most powerful and capable person, Reinhard leaves a will to his Empress consort Hildegard, in which he states that if their son (Alexander Siegfried) fails to prove promising as his successor, there should be no reason for the Lohengramm Dynasty to continue. He dies of an unprecedented congenital disease for which no cure seems to have existed at the time. The disease is posthumously named The Emperor's Sickness by the confused physicians.

Though a matchless genius by all account, Reinhard's main flaw lies in the restriction of his emotions, as he opens his heart to two people only: his beloved sister Annerose and his closest friend and loyal companion Kircheis. Not even his wife Hildegard is allowed within. Annerose describes him as a star that shines brightly until it completely burns itself out; that the day Reinhard slows down his pace would be the dawn of his end.

The flagship of Reinhard is called Brünhild. As it is exclusively painted in white, the flagship is easily distinguishable. Built with the latest technology of the time, the battleship earns a sobriquet ‘The Unsinkable Ship', for surviving all of her battles without a single damage in spite of its constant acting as a spearhead of the fleet. The only damage Brünhild ever receives is caused by an infiltration from which a direct engagement of battle ensues with a boarding party of 730 combatants led by Julian Mintz towards the end of the series. The ship is decommissioned after Reinhard's death and thereafter remains in Dock 01 of the Galactic Empire Odin as a memento. The name Lohengramm is also a reference to Lohengrin, a character from German Arthurian literature.

In the 2018 series, he is voiced by Mamoru Miyano in Japanese and by Aaron Dismuke in English.

Yang Wen Li
Yang Wen Li, voiced by Kei Tomiyama (OVA series), later by Hozumi Gōda (Gaiden series), is one of two protagonists within the series. Like Reinhard, both of them share similar roles within their respective nations as famous national heroes renowned for their military skill. Compared to Reinhard, Yang is much more humble and dislikes his popularity as being a burden. Yang originally wanted to become a historian and only attended the Free Planets Defense Force Command Academy so he can get free education, while Reinhard relishes his fame and was ambitious to overthrow the empire. At the start of the series, Yang has gained some fame as the "Hero of El Facil" for his exploits in the evacuation of the planet before Imperial occupation, and gains much more fame to become a national hero by the end of the first season. During the second season, he generally takes a lesser role compared to Reinhard, but returns in full force in Season 3 before he is assassinated by members of the Terraist Church. Yang was a mild-tempered person who lives on red tea, a genius tactician and strategist that rivals Reinhard. Yang's weakness lies in his unwillingness to risk democracy by assuming more direct powers and responsibilities. Not willing to take on a bigger role or responsibility, he and Reinhard's battle were never in equal footing and at same time handcuffing him from doing things that could change the scale of the power balance. He also openly respects Reinhard and considers him to be a true genius as Reinhard's ability does not seem to confine in just military affairs and is able to act on what his mind tells him while Yang might be reluctant to do so if given same situation. He also agrees that benevolent autocracy is better and more efficient than corrupted democracy if social change is needed, and noted that if he was born in the empire, he would actually volunteer to serve under Reinhard despite his dislike of military. On the other hand, he was glad to be born in the Free Planets Alliance as it gives him freedom, and believes that while democracy is less efficient and can be slowed dramatically with corruption it nevertheless is better because it is less likely to be corrupted completely and no one has absolute power, because after all, a good and wise Emperor such as Reinhard doesn't come along often.

The Hyperion is the flagship of Yang Wen Li. It is retrofitted from a frontier security squadron flagship. It is lightly armed, possessing only 32 forward cannons which comprise its main armament. It possesses a large and spread out multi-level bridge with a large conference table commonly used for meetings by Admiral Yang and his staff, as well as a large tactical viewscreen used during battle to display fleet movements.

In the 2018 series, he is voiced by Kenichi Suzumura in Japanese and by Ian Sinclair in English.

Hildegard von Mariendorf
Hildegard von Mariendorf, voiced by Masako Katsuki, is one of the principal characters in the series. She served as the New Galactic Fleet's Chief Advisor, and later reigned with Reinhard von Lohengramm when she became his wife and Empress in 801 UC.

Hildegard, usually referred to by the nickname Hilda, was born in 777 UC into a distinguished noble family of the Goldenbaum Dynasty, the sole daughter of the benevolent and just Count Franz von Mariendorf. From an early age, she was distinguished from the other girls of the aristocrat society by her independent ideas. Completely unconcerned, Hilda pursued her own interests in reading, politics and history. Her mother having died when Hilda was young, her open-minded father respected Hilda's unique ideas and choices in life.

In 797 UC, the old Galactic Empire split into civil war, where the old nobility stood against the new emerging camp of military elites led by Reinhard von Lohengramm. Hilda convinced her father to plea allegiance to the latter, whereupon she met Reinhard for the first time and impressed him with the clarity of her insight. When the Lohengramm camp emerged victorious from the civil war, Reinhard gained complete political and military power in the empire, and Hilda became Reinhard's chief secretary and assisted him in the progressive reforms that swept across the empire.

From 798 UC to 800 UC, Hilda played an active role on the galactic stage, advising Reinhard wisely on imperial policies and tactics, and became one of his most valued and trusted staff. During Operation Ragnarök, where the empire battled the Alliance, Hilda served as a staff officer on board the flagship Brünhild. During the critical Battle of Vermilion, she perceived that the situation was in Reinhard's disfavour, and persuaded Admirals Mittermeyer and Reuenthal to mobilize forces against the Alliance capital, turning the war to Reinhard's tactical victory and saving his life. Admiral Mittermeyer later praised Hilda that "her intelligence is worth more than a fleet."  Her role gradually became more public after Reinhard's coronation as the first Emperor of the new Lohengramm Dynasty. In the year UC 800, in the Ninth Battle of Iserlohn, Hilda succeeded Admiral Steinmetz to become the Fleet's Chief Advisor, formally capable of representing the Emperor and command on his behalf on the battlefield. Conscious of her military position, Hilda withheld her political role and refused to advise Reinhard on political matters, despite his repeated requests for her counsel.

In August 800 UC, Reinhard was attacked by an assassin who sought vengeance for Reinhard's inaction in the Westerland tragedy. Overcame with regret and emotional agony, Reinhard withdrew into his own quarters and Hilda entered to console him. Subconsciously realizing that his reliance on her has deepened past their professional relationship, he asked her to stay, and she agreed, determined to help him to the best of her abilities. The morning after, Reinhard came to Hilda's home and proposed marriage, and Hilda did not immediately reply for the uncertainty whether she can truly give him happiness. She also did not reveal her pregnancy to him until after the Urvashi affair and Reuenthal's subsequent rebellion, which deepened the insight of both Hilda and Reinhard toward their own feelings. When peace was restored, Hilda accepted Reinhard's second proposal, and they were married on January 19, 801 UC. The officials of the empire greeted their new Empress with enthusiasm and joy. On May 14, while Reinhard was away at war, Hilda give birth to a son, whom Reinhard named Alexander Siegfried von Lohengramm. Reinhard's illness seriously exacerbated a mere sixteen days later and was diagnosed with a rare form mutative connective tissue disease, with no known cure. Despite the illness, Reinhard decided to return to the imperial capital for the sake of the people awaiting him there. On July 18, Reinhard and Hilda were re-united. On July 26, the dying Reinhard said his final words to Hilda: "My Empress, you shall rule the universe more wisely than I. If you think setting up a constitution is the better way then so be it. The universe would be fine as long as the strongest and wisest among all the living governs it. If Alexander Seigfried lacks that ability, there is no need for Lohengramm dynasty to continue. Do everything as you wish; that is my greatest wish..." He died at the age of twenty-five, with their son succeeding him and Hilda ruling as the Empress dowager.

In the 2019 film trilogy, she is voiced by Kana Hanazawa in Japanese and by Brittany Lauda in English.

Siegfried Kircheis
Siegfried Kircheis, voiced by Masashi Hironaka, is Reinhard's closest friend and confidant. Even though Kircheis died very early in the series while protecting Reinhard, he serves as an important role in the series. Reinhard refer him by his last name Kircheis despite their close relationship because Reinhard thought the name Siegfried is too common and boring, while his sister Annerose refer him as Sieg. Kircheis is one of the two most important people in Reinhard's life. Not only does he offer his advice to Reinhard, but he is someone that helps him stay on the right path. Reinhard has always said that Kircheis is someone that can see someone virtuous even in a sewer, and has always had positive thinking no matter what the situation. Kircheis dislikes bloodshed, instead he would rather enemies surrender peacefully and will not pursue a retreating enemy for a kill. He is like Reinhard's shadow even though he is just as talented and intelligent, but Sieg is very satisfied and does not care for power or position, instead he would rather stay by Reinhard's side and protect him. 10 years before the start of the series, Kircheis made a promised Annerose to protect Reinhard and has faithfully kept it ever since. It is hinted that Kircheis is in love with Annerose and that the feeling was mutual, despite neither ever expressing it to each other (at least not shown in any media version). Throughout the series many character have expressed their feelings on how Reinhard might act differently had Kircheis stayed alive. Fans theorize that Kircheis hadn't died so early he may have helped Reinhard become even more powerful and serve as his second in command.

As a military commander, Kircheis was given the highest praise by Yang, stating that Kircheis has no opening for him to take advantage of nor able to allowing him to retreat successfully. Yang also commented after the prisoner exchange that he is more fond of Kircheis (despite it being a quick meeting) than any of politicians in his own country. For the short time he was active in the novel, he was referred to as Reinhard's "Undefeatable Admiral" or as the "Red-hair Brat" by the high nobles. Kircheis earned the respect of all of Reinhard's other admirals and effectively secured his place as the "Number 2" man in Lord Reinhard's ranks. Kind and handsome, he is described to have "flame-like" red hair. Kircheis and Lord Reinhard were inseparable as both friends and war comrades. During the first season, Lady Annerose told Kircheis that should Lord Reinhard one day stop listening to him, then he will walk down the path of self-destruction. His flagship Barbarossa was originally going to be a Brunhild class ship like Reinhard's but Kircheis decided that Brunhild should be in a class by its own and declined it in the novel. The ship's body is painted in red in reference to his "flame-like" hair. It is also the only ship in series that was never damaged, and according to the databooks, it was decommissioned after Kircheis's death and awarded the spot of Dock 02, docked right next to Brunhild as memento. Despite various posthumous titles given to him by Reinhard, on his tombstone there was only an engraving of his name and phrase "My friend".

In the 2018 anime series, he is voiced by Yūichirō Umehara in Japanese and by Clifford Chapin in English.

Julian Mintz
Julian Mintz, voiced by Nozomu Sasaki is the adopted teenage son of Yang Wen Li. Julian's role as Yang Wen Li's assistant starts as a minor character in the beginning of the series, usually seen as taking care of his messy and haphazard adopted guardian, but as the story progresses he becomes more central to the story of the Free Planets Alliance's struggle. Yang Wen Li regularly expressed a desire that Julian would not become a soldier, rather advocating that Julian take a civilian role, perhaps in government, but eventually consents to Julian's entry into the armed forces. After a successful mission to Earth to uncover and eventually (with the inadvertent assistance of the Imperial troops) destroy the headquarters of the notorious Terraist Church, he rises in stature before finally rising after the events of the third series to the reluctant military leader of the Iserlohn Republic Government, at age 18. An astute military commander not unlike his guardian, Julian succeeded into entering negotiations with Kaiser Reinhard after the Battle of Shiva where he negotiated for the autonomy of the planet Heinessen and its surrounding starzone in exchange for control of Iserlohn Fortress.

In the 2018 series he is voiced by Yūki Kaji in Japanese and by Matt Shipman in English.

Supporting characters

Oskar von Reuenthal
Oskar von Reuenthal, voiced by Norio Wakamoto, flagship Tristan, is someone with vast intelligence and talent. Nicknamed "Bewitching Eyes" for his complete heterochromia. He swore his loyalty to Reinhard when he asked Reinhard to save Mittermeyer from the Goldenbaum Dynasty. Even though he is loyal, he sometimes has thoughts about attaining even more power for himself, which led to his downfall. He has no problems finding women, but he despises the idea of settling down and having children because his mother attempted to kill him when he was an infant due to his heterochromatic eyes. In the end his pride compelled him to rebel after being framed for an assassination attempt against Reinhard and died of wounds taken during a battle against Mittermeyer, but in his heart he was still supportive and loyal to him. Reuenthal left the son that he had with Elfriede von Kohlrausch, to Mittermeyer.

In the 2018 anime, he is voiced by Yūichi Nakamura in Japanese and by Ricco Fajardo in English.

Wolfgang Mittermeyer
Wolfgang Mittermeyer, voiced by Katsuji Mori, flagship Beowulf, is best friends with Reuenthal and both were together referred to as the "Twin Pillars of the Empire", after the death of Kircheis. Mittermeyer served with Reunthal as Reinhard's Fleet Admirals in the new dynasty. Mittermeyer is highly disciplined and moral, finding himself often siding with Reunthal against Oberstein, but also just as often keeping Reunthal's musings in check. At the same time Mittermeyer is extremely loyal to his leader and friend Kaiser Reinhard, choosing to personally confront Reunthal in battle to avoid harbouring any ill will towards the Kaiser should Reunthal have been killed.
His attacks were often seen as swift as a gale of wind, earning him the nickname "The Gale Wolf". Mittermeyer is also married to Evangeline, whom he met when young and still loves very much. They had tried to have children for many years without success, and later adopted Reuenthal's son as his own, his wife naming the child Felix.

In the 2018 anime, he is voiced by Daisuke Ono in Japanese and by Josh Grelle in English.

Paul von Oberstein
Paul von Oberstein, voiced by Kaneto Shiozawa, first served as Reinhard's advisor and later as Minister of Military Affairs. He has two cybernetic eyes as well as a cold and emotionless personality which makes most people dislike him. He is a strategic genius but is weak wherever human emotions are involved. He is, however, one of Reinhard von Lohengramm's most efficient subordinates, and extremely concerned about the well-being of the new dynasty.
He dies during a terrorist attack conducted by the Terraist Church. It is not clear whether he died as a decoy for Reinhard or if it was simply a miscalculation on his plan. He has a dog, for whom he cares deeply.

In the 2018 anime, Paul is voiced by Junichi Suwabe in Japanese and by J. Michael Tatum in English.

Fritz Josef Bittenfeld
Fritz Josef Bittenfeld, voiced by Keiichi Noda, flagship Königs Tiger (King Tiger), is the commander of the Schwarz Lanzenreiter (Black Lancers), who are experts in hunter-killer tactics. Bittenfeld was in Reinhard's fleet when Reinhard was just a vice admiral. Bittenfeld is known as a 'wild boar' because of his aggressiveness and temper, and often has problems with Paul von Oberstein because of that.

In the 2018 anime, he is voiced by Tetsu Inada in Japanese and by Austin Tindle in English.

Ulrich Kesler
Ulrich Kesler, voiced by Shūichi Ikeda, usually does administrative police work and helps Reinhard investigate. He is a righteous individual and very reliable. Reinhard first heard of Kesler from police records where Kesler defended a woman who was supposed to be tortured to death for stepping on a painting of the Kaiser. Kesler was usually sent to serve in rural areas or in similar unpopular assignments as indirect punishment for his integrity under the corrupt old rule. During the 6th Iserlohn battle, Reinhard told Kesler when he gained more power he would give Kesler a position in Odin that is suited for his abilities.
After Reinhard's coronation he is assigned as the leader of the military police. While preventing an assassination attempt against Kaiserine Hildegard and Crown Princess Annerose by the Terraist cult, he meets Marika von Freuerbach, a servant, whom he marries two years later. He is also promoted to Fleet Admiral after Reinhard's death.

Neidhardt Müller
Neidhardt Müller, voiced by Yū Mizushima, flagship Lübeck, is known as the "Iron Shield" in honor of successfully defending Reinhard in the Battle of Vermillion to the point of changing his command to five different ships after the destruction of the previous ones, including his own flagship. Müller was awarded the new class battleship Percivale in recognition of his service. He is the youngest of all Reinhard's admirals.

Adalbert von Fahrenheit
Adalbert von Fahrenheit, voiced by Shō Hayami, flagship Ahsgrimm, is known for his strong offensive tactics. Fahrenheit opposed Reinhard during the Lippschadt war, but surrendered and was given amnesty after the war ended. Highly valued for his capabilities, Fahrenheit was restored to active duty as one of Reinhard's admirals.  He is later killed in battle at the Isherlohn Corridor.

In the 2018 anime he's voiced by Ryōta Takeuchi in Japanese and by Daman Mills in English.

Ernst von Eisenach
Ernst von Eisenach, voiced by Masane Tsukayama, known as the Silent Admiral.  He is not really mute and is known for surprising all the admirals once by uttering merely "Checkmate" after a strategic meeting. He usually uses hand signs in lieu of verbal commands to direct his fleet in battle. His most significant maneuver came in the Battle of Shiva, where he nearly wiped out the entirety of the Iserlohn Fleet along with Fritz Josef Bittenfeld. In that maneuver, his fleet caused significant damage to the Flagship Hyperion, killing High Admiral Merkatz.

Groups

Galactic Reich / Empire

Lohengramm faction
 Großadmiral Reinhard von Lohengramm (von Müsel) - Ryō Horikawa, Miki Narahashi (in childhood, ep. 85)
 Generaladmiral (after death: Großadmiral, Großherzog) Siegfried Kircheis - Masashi Hironaka
 Großadmiral Paul von Oberstein - Kaneto Shiozawa

Leading admirals 
 Großadmiral Oskar von Reuenthal (767 - December 16, 800 UC, Heinessenpolis) - Norio Wakamoto
 Großadmiral Wolfgang Mittermeyer - Katsuji Mori
 Großadmiral Ernest Mecklinger - Takaya Hashi, Mahito Ohba (2018 anime) (Japanese), Aaron Roberts (2018 anime) (English)
 Großadmiral Fritz Josef Bittenfeld - Keiichi Noda
 Generaladmiral (after death: Großadmiral) Karl Gustav Kempf (762 - May 798 UC, Geiersburg Fortress ) - Tesshō Genda, Hiroki Yasumoto (2018 anime) (Japanese), Robert McCollum (2018 anime) (English)
 Generaladmiral (after death: Großadmiral) Cornelius Lutz ( - October 8, 800 UC, Uruvasi ) - Katsunosuke Hori, Hirofumi Nojima (2018 anime) (Japanese), Brandon McInnis (2018 anime) (English)
 Großadmiral August Samuel Wahlen - Masaaki Okabe, Hisao Egawa (2018 anime) (Japanese), Brandon Potter (2018 anime) (English)
 Großadmiral Ulrich Keßler - Shūichi Ikeda
 Großadmiral Neidhardt Müller - Yū Mizushima
 Generaladmiral (after death: Großadmiral) Karl Robert Steinmetz ( - 6 May, 800 UC, Iserlohn Corridor ) - Hiroya Ishimaru
 Generaladmiral (after death: Großadmiral) Adalbert von Fahrenheit ( - 30 April, 800 UC, Iserlohn Corridor ) - Shō Hayami
 Großadmiral Ernst von Eisenach - Masane Tsukayama
 Generaladmiral Helmut Rennenkampf, - July 23, 799 UC, Heinessenpolis, suicide) - Takeshi Watabe

Staff 
 Hildegard von Mariendorf - Masako Katsuki
 Konteradmiral Arthur von Streit - Kōji Totani, Kenji Yamauchi (2019 film trilogy) (Japanese), David Wald (2019 film trilogy) (English)
 Leutnant Theodor von Lücke - Yasunori Matsumoto
 Konteradmiral Anton Ferner - Kenyū Horiuchi, Isshin Chiba (2019 film trilogy) (Japanese), Brandon Winckler (2019 film trilogy) (English)
 Emil von Seclä - Ryōtarō Okiayu

Cabinet ministers 
 Graf Franz von Mariendorf - Tadashi Nakamura, (Japanese), Jerry Jewell (2018 anime) (English)
 Karl Bracke - Yūji Fujishiro
 Eugen Richter - Mahito Tsujimura
 Bruno von Silverberche - Kōichi Yamadera
 Gluck - Atsushi Gotō
 Julius Elsheimer - Kiyonobu Suzuki
 Heydrich Lang - Hitoshi Takagi (2nd season), Tarō Ishida (3rd & 4th seasons)

Civilians 
 Gräfin (later Großherzogin) Annerose von Grünewald - Keiko Han, Maaya Sakamoto (2018 anime) (Japanese), Amber Lee Connors (2018 anime) (English) 
 Evangeline Mittermeyer - Yuriko Yamamoto
 Felix Mittermeyer - Tomoe Hanba
 Freiin Magdalena von Westpfahle- Mari Yokoo
 Konrad von Moder - Masami Kikuchi
 Heinrich Lambertz - Kappei Yamaguchi
 Marika von Feuerbach - Aya Hisakawa
 Elfriede von Kohlrausch - Michie Tomizawa
 Freiherr Heinrich von Kümmel - Yūji Mitsuya

Lohengramm Fleet 
 Vizeadmiral Isak Fernand von Turneisen - Shinya Ōtaki
 Freiherr Kalnap - Ryoji Yamamoto
 Admiral Rolf Otto Brauhitsch - Jūji Matsuda
 Flottillenadmiral Siegbert Seidritz

Mittermeyer Fleet 
 Karl Eduard Bayerlein - Hisao Ōyama (1st season), Nobutoshi Canna (2nd season - 4th season)
 Volker Axel von Bülow - Akira Murayama, Yōichi Nishijima (2018 anime) (Japanese), Alejandro Saab (2018 anime) (English)
 Droysen - Shigeru Saitō
 Horst Sinzer - Kazuo Hayashi
 Armsdorf - Motomu Kiyokawa (1st season), Kiyomitsu Mizuuchi (2nd season -)
 Dickel - Kazuhiro Nakata

Reuenthal Fleet 
 Hans Eduard Bergengrün - Ryōichi Tanaka, Kōji Hiwatari (2018 anime) (Japanese), Newton Pittman (2018 anime) (English)
 Emil von Reckendorf - Makoto Ataka
 Bruno von Knapfstein - Nobuyuki Hiyama
 Alfred Grillparzer - Nobuo Shimazaki (2nd season), Shunsuke Sakuya (3rd & 4th seasons)

Fritz Joseph Bittenfeld - Schwarz Lanzenreiter (Black Lancers)
 Admiral Halberstadt
 Admiral Grebner
 Konteradmiral Eugen

High nobles 
 Herzog Otto von Braunschweig - Osamu Kobayashi, Jiro Saito (2019 film trilogy) (Japanese), Patrick Seitz (2019 film trilogy) (English)
 Fürst Wilhelm von Littenheim III - Mikio Terashima, Eiji Hanawa (2019 film trilogy) (Japanese)
 Fürst Klaus von Lichtenrade (became Herzog after the death of Friedrich IV)
 Freiherr Flegel - Issei Futamata, Tōru Furuya (2019 film trilogy) (Japanese), Jason Liebrecht (2019 film trilogy) (English)
 Graf Alfred von Lansberg - Yoku Shioya, Masayoshi Sugawara (2019 film trilogy) (Japanese), Chris Cason (2019 film trilogy) (English)
 Herzog Maximilian von Kastrop - Hideyuki Hori, Takahiro Yoshino (2018 anime) (Japanese), Kyle Phillips (2018 anime) (English)
 Fürst Wilhelm von Klopstock - Kinpei Azusa
 Graf Jochen von Remscheid Kyoji Kobayashi, Mitsuaki Madono (2018 anime) (Japanese), Doug Jackson (2018 anime) (English)

Other admirals 
 Großadmiral Gregor von Mückenberger - Hidekatsu Shibata, Ikuya Sawaki (2018 anime) (Japanese), Bruce DuBose (2018 anime) (English)
 Generaladmiral Ovlesser - Daisuke Gōri, Tsuyoshi Koyama (2018 anime) (Japanese), Bryan Massey (2018 anime) (English)
 Admiral Staaden - Ichirō Murakoshi, Kiyomitsu Mizuuchi (2018 anime) (Japanese), Charles C. Campbell (2018 anime) (English)
 Admiral Fürst Richard von Grinmelshausen - Ryūji Saikachi
 Admiral Thomas von Stockhausen - Ichirō Nagai, Eizō Tsuda (2018 anime) (Japanese), Jim White (2018 anime) (English)
 Admiral Hans Dietrich von Seeckt - Shōzō Iizuka, Yō Kitazawa (2018 anime) (Japanese), Mike Pollock (2018 anime) (English)
 Konteradmiral Erlache - Masaharu Satō (1st season), Yūsaku Yara (Movie), Naomi Kusumi (2018 anime) (Japanese), Bill Jenkins (2018 anime) (English)
 General des Technik Anton Hilmer von Schaft
 Konteradmiral (after death: Admiral) Hermann von Lüneburg - Nachi Nozawa, 11th Commander of the Rosenritter Regiment
 Flottillenadmiral Ansbach - Makio Inoue, Hiroki Tōchi (2018 anime) (Japanese), David Matranga (2018 anime) (English)

Other soldiers 
 Kapitän Christopf von Köfenhiller
 Kapitänleutnant Fügenberg - Toshihiko Seki
 Erich von Hardenberg - Isao Sasaki
 Tonio - Michitaka Kobayashi

Civilians 
 Therese Wagner - Noriko Hidaka
 Fürstin Susanna von Benemünde - Toshiko Fujita

Cabinet ministers 
 Reichsminister Klaus von Lichtenrade - Kohei Miyauchi (OVA series) Hiroshi Ito (Gaiden series), Kazuo Oka (2018 anime) Tomomichi Nishimura (2019 film trilogy) (Japanese), Barry Yandell (English)
 Gerlach - Jōji Yanami, Takaya Hashi (2018 anime) (Japanese), Christopher Guerrero (2018 anime) (English)

Kaiser/Emperor 
Rudolf the Great (Rudolf von Goldenbaum, reign 1 IC - 42 IC) - Chikao Ōtsuka
Sigismund I
Richard I
Otfried I (reign - 123 IC)
Kaspar I (reign 123 IC - 124 IC)
Julius I (reign 124 IC - 144 IC)
Sigismund II (reign 144 IC - 159 IC)
Otfried II (reign 159 IC - 165 IC)
August I (reign 165 IC - )
Erich I
Richard II
Otto Heinz I
Richard II (reign - 247 IC)
August II (reign 247 IC - 253 IC)
Erich II (reign 253 IC - )
Friedrich I
Leonhard I
Friedrich II
Leonhard II
Friedrich III (reign 330 IC - 336 IC)
Maximilian Joseph I (reign 336 IC - 336 IC)
Gustav I (reign 336 IC - 337 IC)
Maximilian Joseph II (reign 337 IC - 350s IC)
Cornelius I (reign 350s IC - )
Manfred I
Helmut I
Manfred II (reign 398 IC - 399 IC)
Wilhelm I
Wilhelm II
Cornelius II
Otfried III
Erwin Joseph I
Otfried IV
Otto Heinz II
Otfried V (reign - 456 IC)
Friedrich IV (reign 456 IC - 487 IC) - Osamu Saka, Minoru Inaba (2018 anime) (Japanese), Bill Flynn (2018 anime) (English)
Erwin Joseph II (reign 487 IC - 489 IC) - Hiroko Emori, Wakana Kingyo (2019 film trilogy) (Japanese), Luci Christian (2019 film trilogy) (English)
Katharin I (reign 489 IC - 490 IC)

Free Planets Alliance

Yang Fleet
 Yang Wen Li - Kei Tomiyama (series), Hozumi Gouda (Gaiden)
 Julian Mintz - Nozomu Sasaki
 Yang's adopted son, he later served as commander of the Iserlohn Republic Military at the age of eighteen.
 Frederica Greenhill - Yoshiko Sakakibara, Aya Endo (2018 anime) (Japanese), Madeleine Morris (2018 anime) (English)
 Frederica Greenhill first met Yang during the evacuation of El Facil. She joined the military to find him again and was assigned as his adjutant. Before the Battle of Vermilion, Yang proposed marriage to her and she accepted, and the two of them lived a married life for a few months before Yang was arrested by the Galactic Empire. During their time at the El Facil Revolutionary Government, she continued to serve as his adjutant. If not for a fever, she would have joined Admiral Yang aboard the Leda II when he was assassinated. After his death, she served as the leader of the Iserlohn Republic Supreme Council
 Alex Cazellnu or Alex Cazerne - Keaton Yamada, Tokuyoshi Kawashima (2018 anime) (Japanese), Chuck Huber (2018 anime), Anthony Bowling (2019 film trilogy) (English)
 Admiral in charge of logistics and supply as well as being the Administrator of Iserlohn Fortress. He often remains behind as fortress commander when the Yang Fleet is in the field.
 Dusty Attenborough - Kazuhiko Inoue, Kaito Ishikawa (2018 anime) (Japanese), Jordan Dash Cruz (2018 anime) (English)
 One of the commanding officers of the 13th fleet, and later, space fleet commander of the Iserlohn Republic. Achieved the rank of Vice Admiral at his late twenties, even faster than Yang.
 Edwin Fischer - Taimei Suzuki, Osamu Sonoe (2018 anime) (Japanese), Kenny Green (2018 anime) (English)
 Admiral in charge of fleet maneuvers.
 Nguyen Van Huu - Masayuki Omoro, Kenta Miyake (2019 film trilogy) (Japanese), Jarrod Greene (2019 film trilogy) (English)
 Murai - Takeshi Aono, Hochu Otsuka (2018 anime) (Japanese), Mike McFarland (2018 anime) (English)
 Fyodor Patrichev - Kōzō Shioya, Masami Iwasaki (2018 anime), Jeremy Inman (2018 anime) (English)
 Bagdash - Akira Kamiya, Shigeru Ushiyama (2019 film trilogy) (Japanese), Chris Hackney (2019 film trilogy) (English)
 A staff officer who was originally sent as a spy, he was later recruited as Yang's head Intelligence Officer.
 Olivier Poplan - Toshio Furukawa, Tatsuhisa Suzuki (2018 anime) (Japanese), Orion Pitts (2018 anime) (English)
 Ivan Konev - Hirotaka Suzuoki, Kousuke Toriumi (2018 anime) (Japanese), Micah Solusod (2018 anime) (English)
 Warren Hughes - Kazuki Yao, Takashi Ohara (2018 anime) (Japanese), Tyler Walker (2018 anime) (English)
 Salé Aziz Cheikly - Yoshikazu Hirano, Hiroshi Kawaguchi (2018 anime) (Japanese), David Wald (2018 anime) (English)
 Willibald Joachim von Merkatz - Gorō Naya, Unshō Ishizuka (2018 anime) Kazuhiro Yamaji (2019 film trilogy) (Japanese), Mark Stoddard (2018 anime) (English)
 High Admiral under Kaiser Freidrich IV who takes refuge with Yang at Iserlohn after the Lippschadt war. Later forced into becoming the Space Fleet Commander-in-Chief of the Goldenbaum government in exile.
 Bernhard von Schneider - Yūichi Meguro, Daisuke Hirakawa (2019 film trilogy) (Japanese), Bryson Baugus (2019 film trilogy) (English)
 Louis Mashengo - Ryūsei Nakao
 Nilsson - Ryūsuke Ōbayashi
 Hazuki - Takeshi Kusao
 Simon - Nobuo Tobita
 Katerose von Kreutzer - Kotono Mitsuishi
 Fighter pilot who is also the daughter of Walter von Schenkoppf.
 Hortence Cazellnu - Keiko Matsuo
 The wife of Alexander Cazellnu and mother of their two daughters.
 Charlotte Phyllis Cazellnu - Yuri Amano
 Jean Robert Lap - Hideyuki Tanaka, Yuuki Ono (2018 anime) (Japanese), Christopher Wehkamp (2018 anime) (English)
 Jessica Edwards - Mami Koyama, Sayaka Kinoshita (2018 anime) (Japanese), Dawn M. Bennett (2018 anime) (English)

Rosenritter Regiment
 Colonel Hermann von Lüneburg - Nachi Nozawa, 11th Commander of the Rosenritter Regiment
 Colonel Otto Frank von Wahnschaffe, 12th Commander of the Rosenritter Regiment
 Brigadier General Walter von Schenkopp or Walter von Schönkopf (July 28, 764 - June 1, 801, Shiva Starzone ) - Michio Hazama, Shinichiro Miki (2018 anime) (Japanese), Christopher R. Sabat (2018 anime) (English)
 13th Commander of the Rosenritter Regiment, a feared ground assault unit within the Free Planets Alliance Infantry Forces. Originally, he came from the Galactic Reich, but defected to the Free Planets Alliance at a young age. He is one of the more outspoken members of the Yang Fleet, especially when it comes to Yang taking over the government.
 Colonel Kasper Lintz - Jūrōta Kosugi, Kenji Hamada (2018 anime), Michael A. Zekas (2018 anime) (English) 
 14th Commander of the Rosenritter Regiment
 Lieutenant Colonel Rainer Blumhardt - Keiichi Nanba, Tsuguo Nogami (2018 anime), Marcus D. Stimac (2018 anime) (English)
 Lieutenant Karl von der Decken

High Councilors 
 Job Trünicht - Unshō Ishizuka, Kazuhiro Anzai (2018 anime) (Japanese), Dave Trosko (2018 anime) (English)
 Joan Lebello - Iemasa Kayumi, Daisuke Egawa (2018 anime) (Japanese), Michael Johnson (2018 anime) (English)
 Huang Louis - Kaneta Kimotsuki, Hidenari Ugaki (2018 anime) (Japanese), Francis Henry (2018 anime) (English)
 Negroponty  - Takanobu Hozumi, Taketora (2019 film trilogy) (Japanese)
 Walter Islands - Yasurō Tanaka, Tomoyuki Shimura (2019 film trilogy) (Japanese)
 Cornelia Windsor - Minori Matsushima, Kumiko Takizawa (2018 anime) (Japanese), Casey Casper (2018 anime) (English)
 Lisa Wamban - Nataka Meza

Other admirals/soldiers 
 Sidney Sithole - Kenji Utsumi, Masaki Aizawa (2018 anime) (Japanese), Ray Hurd (2018 anime) (English)
 Lazar Lobos - Tamio Ōki, Eiji Hanawa (2018 anime) (Japanese), John Baker (2018 anime) (English)
 Dwight Greenhill - Issei Masamune, Mitsuaki Hoshino (2018 anime) (Japanese), Sonny Strait (2018 anime) (English)
 Alexander Bucock - Kōsei Tomita, Bon Ishihara (2018 anime) (Japanese), Kent Williams (2018 anime) (English)
 Trung Yu-Chang - Akio Ōtsuka
 Paeta - Kan Tokumaru, Shinya Fukumatsu (2018 anime) (Japanese), Chris Rager (2018 anime) (English) 
 Hawood - Shinji Ogawa, Hayato Fujii (2018 anime) (Japanese), Paul Slavens (2018 anime) (English)
Vice-Admiral and commander of the 7th Fleet of the Alliance.
 Appleton - Takkō Ishimori, Katsuhisa Hōki (2018 anime) (Japanese), Jeremy Schwartz (2018 anime) (English)
Vice-Admiral and commander of the 8th Fleet of the Alliance.
 al-Salem - Yonehiko Kitagawa, Keiko Sakai (2018 anime) (Japanese), Brad Hawkins (2018 anime) (English)
Vice-Admiral and commander of the 9th Fleet of the Alliance.
 Uranff - Ryūsuke Ōbayashi, Toshiharu Sakurai (2018 anime) (Japanese), Philip Weber (2018 anime) (English)
Vice-Admiral and commander of the 10th Fleet of the Alliance.
 Borodin - Masaru Ikeda, Masafumi Kimura (2018 anime) (Japanese), John Burgmeier (2018 anime) (English)
Vice-Admiral and commander of the 12th Fleet of the Alliance.
 Evans - Michihiro Ikemizu
 Andrew Fork- Tōru Furuya, Hiroshi Kamiya (2018 anime) (Japanese), Justin Briner (2018 anime) (English)
 Arthur Lynch - Masashi Hirose, Issei Futamata (2019 film trilogy) (Japanese), Jay Hickman (2019 film trilogy) (English)
 Valerie Lynn Fitzsimmons - Mika Doi
 Franz Valleymont - Shigeru Nakahara

Mafia of 730 (Second Battle of Tiamat) 
 Bruce Ashbey (710 - December 11, 745, Tiamat Starzone ) - Morio Kazama
 Frederick Jasper ("March" Jasper, 710 - 771) - Keiji Fujiwara
 Wallice Warwick ("Baron" Warwick, 710 - 766) - Rikiya Koyama
 John Drinker Cope (710 - 751, Palantia Starzone ) - Masato Sako
 Vittorio di Bertini (710 - December 11, 745, Tiamat Starzone ) - Kenji Nomura
 Fang Tchewling (710 - 773) - Takayuki Sugō
 Alfred Rosas (710 - 788) - Tetsurō Sagawa (old), Toshihiro Inoue (young)

Battle of Dagon
Lin Pao
Yūsuf Topparol or Yusuf Tpalour
Naismith Ward
Olewinsky
András
Mungai
Hugh Erstedt
Ortrich
Birolinen

Historians 
 E. J. Mackenzie - Shigeru Chiba

Phezzan
 Adrian Rubinsky - Kiyoshi Kobayashi, Hideaki Tezuka (2018 anime) (Japanese), Jason Douglas (2018 anime) (English)
 Dominique Saint-Pierre - Fumi Hirano, Mie Sonozaki (2018 anime) (Japanese), Janelle Lutz (2018 anime) (English)
 Rupert Kesselring - Hirotaka Suzuoki
 Nikolas Boltik – Tatsuyuki Jinnai, Masato Obara (2018 anime) (Japanese), Randy Pearlman (2018 anime) (English)
 Boris Konev - Yoshito Yasuhara, Masami Kikuchi (2019 film trilogy) (Japanese), Sam Black (2019 film trilogy) (English)
 Marinesk - Kenichi Ogata, Kenichi Mochizuki (2019 film trilogy), Kenny James (2019 film trilogy) (English)

Terraism
The Terraist Church is a secret society which emphasized that humans should all return to their home planet of Earth and re-establish its fame as the capital of the universe. While their capital and holiest temple is on Earth beneath the rubble of Mount Kangchenjunga, they have many churches around the galaxy from the Free Planets Alliance capital of Heinessen to the former Imperial capital of Odin, and a very strong presence in the new capital of Phezzan. In particular, they held great influence over the former Phezzani government before its overthrow and re-annexation by the Empire. The terms "terraism" and "terraist" are also a pun on "terrorism" and "terrorist".

 Grand Bishop - Teiji Ōmiya (1st - 3rd season), Dai Sasahara (4th season), Ikkyuu Juku (2019 film trilogy) (Japanese), Brendan Blaber (2019 film trilogy) (English)
 De Villiers - Banjō Ginga, Hideyuki Hori (2019 film trilogy) (Japanese)

Others
 Narrator - Yūsaku Yara, Yoshimitsu Shimoyama (2018 anime) (Japanese), Cris George (2018 anime) (English)

Sources

References
Encyclopaedia Die Legende der Sternhelden: エンサイクロペディア銀河英雄伝説, Tokuma, July 1992, .

Legend of the Galactic Heroes
Legend of the Galactic Heroes